is a passenger railway station located in the city of Niiza, Saitama, Japan, operated by the private railway operator Tobu Railway. Despite its name, the station building is not actually located in Shiki. The city of Shiki has only one station, Yanasegawa Station, which is the next stop after Shiki Station on the Tōbu Tōjō Line.

Lines
Located between Asakadai and Yanasegawa stations, it is 17.8 km from the Ikebukuro terminus. All services except TJ Liner, Kawagoe Limited Express and Rapid Express services stop at this station.

Station layout
The station has two island platforms serving four tracks, with the station building located above, and at a right angle to the platforms. There are two storage tracks adjacent to platform 1, and four storage tracks located between the running lines on the down (Kawagoe) side of the station, as well as a permanent way maintenance storage siding next to platform 4 at the south (Ikebukuro) end of the station.

This station has a season ticket sales office.

Platforms

History

The station opened on 1 May 1914 coinciding with the opening of the Tōjō  Railway line from Ikebukuro. At the time of its opening, the station was located in the town of Shiki (later becoming the city of Shiki). In 1960, a new entrance was added on the south side of the station to improve accessibility for students of the Rikkyo High School (present-day Rikkyo Niiza Junior and Senior High School) which had recently relocated from Ikebukuro to Niiza, Saitama. In 1970, to further improve access to the school, the station was moved closer to Ikebukuro, moving it across the boundary from the city of Shiki into Niiza. While Niiza residents petitioned to have the station name changed, this never came about, and the name was used instead for Niiza Station on the Musashino Line, which opened in 1973.

Through-running to and from  via the Tokyo Metro Fukutoshin Line commenced on 14 June 2008.

From 17 March 2012, station numbering was introduced on the Tōbu Tōjō Line, with Shiki Station becoming "TJ-14".

From March 2023, Shiki Station is no longer a Rapid Express service stop following the abolishment of the Rapid (快速, Kaisoku) services and reorganization of the Tōbu Tōjō Line services.

Future developments
Chest-high platform edge doors are scheduled to be added by the end of fiscal 2020.

Passenger statistics
In fiscal 2019, the station was used by an average of 104,698 passengers daily. Passenger figures for previous years (boarding passengers only) are as shown below.

Surrounding area

 Rikkyo University Niiza Campus
 Rikkyo Niiza Junior and Senior High School 
 Keio Shiki Senior High School

Bus services
Tobu Bus and Seibu Bus operate local bus services from the bus stops on either side of the station.

Since 17 July 2008, there is a direct express bus service to and from Narita Airport (via Asakadai Station). The bus stop is on the south side of the station.

See also
 List of railway stations in Japan

References

External links

 Tobu station information 
 Shiki city history, including photograph of the station in 1914 

Railway stations in Saitama Prefecture
Stations of Tobu Railway
Tobu Tojo Main Line
Railway stations in Japan opened in 1914
Niiza, Saitama